Alexandru Mari (8 November 1919 – 9 September 1997) was a Romanian football midfielder.

International career
Alexandru Mari played four games at international level for Romania, making his debut in a friendly which ended 2–2 against Slovakia. He also played two games at the 1947 Balkan Cup in a 4–0 away victory against Albania and a 3–1 home loss against Yugoslavia. Alexandru Mari's last game for the national team was a friendly which ended with a 6–2 loss against Czechoslovakia.

Honours
Industria Sârmei Câmpia Turzii
Divizia B: 1951
Cupa României runner-up: 1956

Notes

References

External links
Alexandru Mari at Labtof.ro

1919 births
1997 deaths
Romanian footballers
Romania international footballers
Association football midfielders
Liga I players
Liga II players
CSM Câmpia Turzii players
FC Rapid București players
People from Arad, Romania